Qingbaijiang District is one of 11 urban districts of the prefecture-level city of Chengdu, the capital of Sichuan Province, Southwest China, covering parts of the northeastern suburbs. It borders the prefecture-level city of Deyang to the north.

History
The administrative area of Qingbaijiang District was originally Jintang County and Xindu County (now Xindu District).  During the “First Five-Year Plan”, the Chengdu Plain built an industrial zone in Jintang County to solve the problem of “having grain but no steel”.  In 1956, the State Planning Commission and the State Construction Commission decided to build the Sichuan Fertilizer Plant (now Chuanhua Group) in Jintang County. In 1958, Chengdu Steel Plant, the predecessor of Pancheng Steel, was also established here. In order to manage the two enterprises, Chengdu has split some towns and towns from Xindu and Jintang. In 1960, Qingbaijiang District was established.

References

External links

Districts of Chengdu